American Legion Stadium is a baseball venue located in Odessa, TX and the home of the Odessa College Wranglers baseball team in the Western Junior College Athletic Conference. The facility holds a capacity of 1,000.

References

Baseball venues in Texas